The men's 56 kilograms weightlifting event was the lightest men's event at the weightlifting competition, limiting competitors to a maximum of 56 kilograms of body mass. The whole competition took place on August 10, but was divided in two parts due to the number of competitors. Group B weightlifters competed at 10:00, and Group A, at 19:00. This event was the third Weightlifting event to conclude.

Each lifter performed in both the snatch and clean and jerk lifts, with the final score being the sum of the lifter's best result in each. The athlete received three attempts in each of the two lifts; the score for the lift was the heaviest weight successfully lifted.

The Athens gold medalist Turkish Halil Mutlu was not in Beijing to attempt his 4th straight gold medal.

Schedule
All times are China Standard Time (UTC+08:00)

Records

Results

References

 Page 2652

Weightlifting at the 2008 Summer Olympics
Men's events at the 2008 Summer Olympics